Hellbilly 58 is a 2008 horror film directed by Russ Diaper about A Murdered Hillbilly returns from the dead to seek revenge on the town that put him to death in 1958. The small Town of Dackson is about to learn that the legend of 'Hellbilly' is true

Plot

Cast

Production
The development of the film started in September 2006. Hellbilly 58 was inspired by the song of the same name that was released by the band Blazing Haley in their album Sleeper. Director Russ Diaper asked Blazing Haley, the songwriter of HellBilly58 and the band's front man Matt Armor for the rights to use the song, Armor also plays the role of Hank in the film.

HellBilly 58 was filmed in 5 different locations. These Locations included London and Southampton, Hampshire  both located in England; Siegen, North Rhine in Westphalia, Germany; and New York City, New York. The also utilized stock footage of New York City.

Release
Hellbilly 58 was released worldwide on 1 February 2009.

Reception

The film has received mostly positive reviews from critics with a 75% from audience members on the film review web site Rotten Tomatoes.

References

External links
 Hellbilly58 Official Movie Site
 
 Blazing Haley Website - HellBilly58

2008 films
2008 horror films
British horror films
2000s English-language films
2000s British films